Franciscus Bossinensis (fl. 1509 – 1511) (Francis the Bosnian) was a lutenist-composer active in Italy in the 16th century. He lived and worked in Venice. He published two collections of lute music (containing 126 frottolas and 46 ricercares), printed by the Venetian printing house of Ottaviano Petrucci.

References

External links
 

16th-century Italian composers
Year of birth missing
Year of death missing
Bosnia and Herzegovina composers
Renaissance composers
Male classical composers
Musicians from Venice